Cicely Irwin (born 13 October 1999) is a British female acrobatic gymnast. With partners Jennifer Bailey and Josephine Russell, Irwin competed in the 2014 Acrobatic Gymnastics World Championships.

References

1999 births
Living people
British acrobatic gymnasts
Female acrobatic gymnasts